Dalheri is a village in Saharanpur district, Uttar Pradesh state, India.

Demographics
Dalheri is a large village with total 1763 families residing. The Dalheri village has population of 4850 of which 2566 are males while 2284 are females as per Population Census 2011. Average sex ratio of Dalheri village is 890 which is lower than Uttar Pradesh state average of 912.

Dalheri village has higher literacy rate compared to Uttar Pradesh. In 2011, literacy rate of Dalheri village was 73.36% compared to 67.68% of Uttar Pradesh. In Dalheri Male literacy stands at 81.63% while female literacy rate was 64.26%.

References

Villages in Saharanpur district